Vittore de Franceschi was a Roman Catholic prelate who was Bishop of Famagusta (1552–?).

Biography
On 12 February 1552, Filippo Bonwas appointed during the papacy of Pope Julius III as Bishop of Famagusta. It is uncertain how long he served. The next bishop of record is Gerolamo Ragazzoni who was appointed on 15 January 1561. While bishop, he was the principal co-consecrator of Vincenzo Diedo, Patriarch of Venice (1556).

References

External links and additional sources
 (for Chronology of Bishops) 
 (for Chronology of Bishops) 

16th-century Roman Catholic bishops in the Republic of Venice
Bishops appointed by Pope Julius III